WIMK (93.1 FM) is a radio station based in the Upper Peninsula of Michigan, licensed to Iron Mountain, Michigan.  The station broadcasts an active rock format branded as 93.1 K-Rock.

History
WIMK began life in 1981 as a beautiful music station, before switching to country music by the early 1980s.  In 1985, the station adopted a Top 40 (CHR) format as "K93," and then evolved to an album-oriented rock format later in the decade, originally branded as "K-Rock."  By the 2000s, the station adopted the name "Classic Rock: The Bear", joining Northern Star's existing group of Northern Michigan stations with this branding, though their programming was not part of that specific network of stations, and aired its own music rotation.

Following the station's sale from Northern Star Broadcasting to Sovereign Communications in 2010, WIMK broke their simulcast and re-imaged as "93 Rock", adopting a similar identity, logo, and playlist as Rock 101, Sovereign's existing active rock station in Sault Ste. Marie, Michigan at WSUE 101.3 FM.

In July 2020, WIMK was sold to AMC Partners and re-branded as "93.1 K-Rock".

References

Sources
Michiguide.com - WIMK history

External links
93.1 K-Rock

IMK
Active rock radio stations in the United States
Radio stations established in 1985
1985 establishments in Michigan